Jessica Opare Saforo (born 29 April 1981) is a Ghanaian media personality, TV and radio broadcaster and entrepreneur. Also, she is the host for Transformation with Jess, Ghana's first ever weight loss reality TV show. She is the owner of The Voice Ova Company, a business that specializes in managing voice talent.

Education 
Saforo had her secondary education at Akosombo International School and holds a bachelor's degree in art from the University of Ghana, Legon where she majored in Economics and Psychology.

Career
Saforo has worked in radio for about 20 years and TV for about 16 years hence she is one of the longest serving presenters on the Ghanaian scene. She started working as a radio presenter in 2000 at Vibe FM and then in 2004 moved to Choice FM. She later moved to Citi FM in 2005 where she became the host for Citi Drive and then later, Brunch in The Citi and then, The Traffic Avenue. She used to be the co-host of Celebrity Fanzone on GH One TV, an award-winning celebrity and lifestyle show but now hosts Sister Sister, an all women relationship talkshow. She worked as the Programmes Manager of Citi 97.3 FM and Citi TV, two of Ghana's most influential channels.

She is the owner of The Voice Ova Company, a business that specializes in producing professional radio and television ads and managing voice talent and also the Founder of Biker Girls GH. Jessica also hosted Miss Malaika Ghana and Stars of the Future for several years. With over 22 years of experience in the Ghanaian media space, Jessica Opare-Saforo currently runs her own media company and YouTube channels, with the core focus on relationships and life coaching

GhanaWeekend reported that Jessica had quit from Citi FM and Citi TV on January 28, 2022. She had hosted a series of programs in the media network; ‘Brunch in the Citi’, ‘Sex in the Citi’, ‘Sister Sister’, ‘Upside Down’ and ‘Traffic Avenue’ (formerly ‘Citi Drive’) which is Citi FM's late afternoon show.

Awards
Here are some awards she has won:
 
|-
|| 2013  ||| Jessica Opare Saforo || Radio and Television Personality Awards (Best Mid-Morning Show Host ) ||  
|-
|| 2014 |||Jessica Opare Saforo|| Radio and Television Personality Awards (Female Radio Presenter of the Year || 
|-

|| 2014 |||Jessica Opare Saforo|| Eagles Summit Africa Leadership and Empowerment Awards (Female Radio Personality of the Year || 
|-
|| 2015  ||| Jessica Opare Saforo ||  DJ Awards (Best Female Radio DJ) ||  
|-
|| 2015  ||| Jessica Opare Saforo ||  Radio and Television Personality Awards (Radio Late Afternoon Show host of the year) ||  
|-
|| 2015 ||| Jessica Opare Saforo  ||  Radio and Television Personality Awards (Best Female Radio Presenter) || 
|-
|| 2016 ||| Jessica Opare Saforo  ||  Radio and Television Personality Awards (Personality of the Year) || 
|-
|| 2016 ||| Jessica Opare Saforo  ||  Radio and Television Personality Awards (Radio Late Afternoon Show host of the year) || 
|-
|| 2016 ||| Jessica Opare Saforo  ||  Radio and Television Personality Awards (Radio Female Presenter of the Year) || 
|-
|}

References

Living people
1981 births
University of Ghana alumni
Ghanaian women journalists
Ghanaian journalists